Belmont is a residential area of the London Borough of Harrow, located between Stanmore, Kenton, Wealdstone and Queensbury.

Etmyology
The area is named after the mound constructed in the early 18th century by Henry James Brydges, Earl of Carnarvon and first Duke of Chandos. He had a summer house built atop the mound for the wonderful view. The mound, or mount, is now the Stanmore Golf Course.

Locale
Belmont is a suburban residential district and was formerly served by Belmont station, on a railway single-line branch running from Harrow & Wealdstone station to Stanmore Village railway station. The line was known locally as The Rattler, a term first coined by Pete Knobbler. The site of the station is now a car park. What may remain of the platform and track lies beneath tons of earth and rubble used to bring the car park up to street level. The Belmont Trail is a nature trail between Wealdstone and Stanmore running along much of the original track route. The circle was originally made for a tram line that would go across London. Its 4 exits were made due to this.

Belmont Circle provides the main focus of the area, being a large, circular parade of that intersects Kenton Lane. Many of the outlets are now food-related, with a few bars and a club completing the lineup. What was formerly the Belmont (and later The Spanish Arch) pub is now 'Funky B, a bar/restaurant serving authentic Indian food. Just off the Circle, Belmont Community Hall hosts local activities, events and a regular jumble sale.

Demography

In the 2011 census, the largest ethnic group in Belmont ward was Indian (34%), followed by White British (30%). Religion wise, 34% of residents adhered to Christianity, 30% to Hinduism, 11% to Islam, 8% to Judaism, 4% to Jainism, and 6% were not religious.

Transport
There are no train stations in Belmont today but both Harrow & Wealdstone and Canons Park tube station are accessible nearby. Bus routes 186, H18 and H19 serve the area.

References

External links

Areas of London
Districts of the London Borough of Harrow